The 1927 Illinois Fighting Illini football team was an American football team that represented the University of Illinois in the 1927 Big Ten Conference football season. The Fighting Illini compiled a 7–0–1 record (5–0 against Western Conference opponents) and outscored their opponents by a combined total of 152 to 24.

Illinois was also ranked No. 1 in the nation in the Dickinson System ratings released in December 1927. Illinois was also retroactively named as the national champion for 1927 by the Billingsley Report, Helms Athletic Foundation, National Championship Foundation, and Parke H. Davis. 

Center Robert Reitsch and guard Russ Crane were selected as first-team players on the 1927 All-America college football team: Reitsch by the North American Newspaper Alliance and Lawrence Perry; and Crane by Grantland Rice for Collier's Weekly. Reitsch was also the team captain. Other notable players included halfback Jud Timm; end Garland Grange; and tackle Butch Nowack.

Schedule

Roster 

Head Coach: Robert Zuppke (15th year at Illinois)

References

Illinois
Illinois Fighting Illini football seasons
College football national champions
Big Ten Conference football champion seasons
College football undefeated seasons
Illinois Fighting Illini football